Steve Westfall (born December 16, 1955 in Gassaway, West Virginia) is an American politician and a Republican member of the West Virginia House of Delegates representing District 12 since January 12, 2013.

Education
Westfall earned his BS in education from Glenville State College.

Elections
2012 When incumbent Republican Representative Mitch Carmichael ran for West Virginia Senate and left the seat open, Westfall was unopposed for the May 8, 2012 Republican Primary, winning with 1,590 votes, and won the November 6, 2012 General election, winning with 3,442 votes (49.7%) against Democratic nominee Jo Boggess Phillips (who had run for the seat in 2008 and 2010) and Mountain Party candidate Justin Johnson.

References

External links
Official page at the West Virginia Legislature

Steve Westfall at Ballotpedia
Steve Westfall at OpenSecrets

1955 births
Living people
Glenville State College alumni
Republican Party members of the West Virginia House of Delegates
People from Gassaway, West Virginia
People from Ripley, West Virginia
21st-century American politicians